Zachariayude Garbhinikal ( is a Malayalam–language comedy-drama film written and directed by Aneesh Anwar. The film narrates the incidents in the life of a gynaecologist Dr.Zacharia and five women who come into his life. Lal appears as the gynaecologist while Rima Kallingal, Sanusha, Geetha, Asha Sarath, and Sandra Thomas play the roles of five pregnant women. Vijay Babu, Sandra Thomas and Sandra's father Thomas Joseph Pattathanam produced this film under the banner of Friday Film House . The film started production in May 2013 from Kochi, Kerala.

The music track of a song in the film, "Veyil Chilla", became popular. The song has similarity to Vangelis' theme "Conquest of Paradise". The film had a relatively new composer duo, Vishnu and Sharath, son and nephew of musician Mohan Sithara. The background score of the film was composed by Prashant Pillai.

The film won four awards at Kerala State Film Awards of 2013.Lal bagged Best Actor for the portrayal of Dr.Zacharia, Aneesh Anwar won Best Story and Special Jury Award for Best Director and Sanusha won  Special Jury Mention for her performance as Zaira.

Plot
The film narrates the incidents in the life of a gynaecologist and five women who come into his life each with unconventional/illegitimate pregnancies. Lal acts as the gynaecologist and Asha Sarath does the role of doctor's wife. Sanusha plays the role of an eighteen-year-old girl who refuses to abort her child and reveal the child's father. In the end, she gives her baby to the gynaecologist and his wife who don't have children of their own. After some months, she visits the doctor's house and leaves him a book. And from reading one of the story in the book that she specially marked he figures out that she bore the child of her father.  Rima's character is a nurse, while Geetha plays an elderly woman who gets pregnant through  artificial insemination. Aju Varghese appears as Ajmal who has strong feelings for Fatima. However, due to their height difference, he is unable to confide his love for her. Sandra Thomas plays the role of another expectant woman who bears her boyfriend's child which she wants to conceive only if her husband dies and Joy Mathew acts as her husband.

Cast

Controversy
The film courted controversy for showing an animation in the climax scene based on Padmarajan's short story, "Moovanthy". Following a complaint against the makers for copyright infringement, the court had issued an order prohibiting the satellite telecast of the movie.

References

2010s Malayalam-language films
Indian pregnancy films
2013 films